Nino Cocchiarella (born 1933) is an American philosopher who is Professor Emeritus of Philosophy at Indiana University Bloomington. He is best known for his work in formal logic and ontology.

Among his important articles are:
 "Nominalism and Conceptualism as Predicative Second Order Theories of Predication", Notre Dame Journal of Formal Logic, vol. 21 (1980)
 "Richard Montague and the Logical Analysis of Language", in Contemporary Philosophy: A New Survey, vol. 2, Philosophy of Language/Philosophical Logic, G. Fløistad, ed., Martinus Nijhoff, The Hague (1981)
 "The Development of the Theory of Logical Types and the Notion of a Logical Subject in Russell's Early Philosophy", Synthese, vol. 45 (1980).

His books include Logical Investigations of Predication Theory and the Problem of Universals (1986); Logical Studies in Early Analytic Philosophy (1987); Formal Ontology and Conceptual Realism, New York, Springer (2007); and Modal Logic. An Introduction to its Syntax and Semantics (with Max Freund), Oxford, Oxford University Press (2008).

External links 
 "The Conceptual Realism of Nino Cocchiarella"
 Complete and annotated bibliography of Nino Cocchiarella:
 1966–1985
 1986–2018

Logicians
Philosophers of language
1933 births
Living people